The Lanchester Motor Company Limited was a car manufacturer located until early 1931 at Armourer Mills, Montgomery Street, Sparkbrook, Birmingham, and afterwards at Sandy Lane, Coventry England. The marque has been unused since the last Lanchester was produced in 1955. The Lanchester Motor Company Limited is still registered as an active company and accounts are filed each year, although as of 2014 it is marked as "non-trading".

The Lanchester company was purchased by the BSA Group at the end of 1930, after which its cars were made by Daimler on Daimler's Coventry sites. So, with Daimler, Lanchester became part of Jaguar Cars in 1960.

In 1990 Ford Motor Company bought Jaguar Cars and it remained in their ownership, and from 2000 accompanied by Land Rover, until they sold both Jaguar and Land Rover to Tata Motors in 2008, who created Jaguar Land Rover as a subsidiary holding company for them. In 2013, Jaguar Cars was merged with Land Rover to form Jaguar Land Rover Limited, and the rights to the Lanchester car brand were transferred to the newly formed British multinational car manufacturer Jaguar Land Rover.

History

The three brothers

This business was begun by the three Lanchester brothers, Frederick, one of the most influential automobile engineers of the 19th and 20th centuries, George and Frank who together incorporated The Lanchester Engine Company Limited in December 1899 retaining the financial support they had previously received from the two brothers, Charles Vernon Pugh and John Pugh of Rudge-Whitworth. Others who took directorships included the Whitfield brothers, J. S. Taylor and Hamilton Barnsley – a master builder who sold the business to BSA-Daimler in 1931.

Work on the first Lanchester car had been started in 1895, significantly designed from first principles as a car, not a horseless carriage, and it ran on the public roads in February or March 1896. It had a single-cylinder 1306 cc engine with the piston having two connecting rods to separate crankshafts and flywheels rotating in opposite directions giving very smooth running. A two-cylinder engine was fitted to the same chassis in 1897 and a second complete car was built alongside it. This led on to the first production cars in 1900, when six were made as demonstrators. These had two-cylinder, 4033 cc, horizontal air-cooled engines, retaining the twin crankshaft design. Steering was by side lever (or tiller) not wheel. The gearbox used epicyclic gearing. The first cars were sold to the public in 1901. In 1902 Lanchester became the first company to market disc brakes to the public. They were mechanical and on the front wheels only. The discs were very thin and made of a very soft metal like brass. Although probably leaving much to be desired, they completely fit the definition of a disc brake, and beat all others to market by many years.

Crystal Palace Automobile Show, January 1903

All bodies were made by external coachbuilders until 1903 when a body department was set up, until 1914 most cars had Lanchester built bodies. In 1904, despite a full order book, the business ran out of money and The Lanchester Engine Company Limited was put into voluntary liquidation. After a period of management by a receiver the business was re-organised re-capitalized and incorporated as The Lanchester Motor Company Limited later that year.

The 1904 models had a 2470 cc, four-cylinder, water-cooled, overhead-valve engines featuring pressure lubrication, very unusual at the time, and were now mounted with the epicyclic gearbox between the front seats rather than centrally, resulting in a design with the driver sitting well forwards and without a bonnet. Six-cylinder models joined the line-up in 1906. The specification started to become more conventional with wheel steering as an option from 1908, becoming standard from the end of 1911, pedals and a gear lever replaced the original two-lever system of gear changing. George Lanchester was now in charge, Frederick having resigned in 1913. The engine was moved further forward to a conventional position in the sporting Forty, with a side-valve, 5.5-litre six-cylinder engine, but very few were made before the outbreak of World War I. A distinctive feature of the engine's valves was their use of leaf springs, rather than coil springs. Frank Lanchester ran the London sales office.

War
During World War I the company made artillery shells and some aircraft engines but some vehicle production continued with the Lanchester armoured cars built on the Lanchester 38 hp chassis for use by the Royal Naval Air Service on the Western Front.

Postwar
After the first World war the company adopted a single model policy and the Forty was re-introduced with a 6.2-litre overhead-cam engine in unit with a 3-speed gearbox still using epicyclic gears and a worm drive rear axle. It was very expensive, dearer than a Rolls-Royce Silver Ghost and to maintain production a smaller car, the Twenty One joined the range in 1924. This had a 3.1-litre, six-cylinder engine, now with removable cylinder head, mated to a four-speed conventional gearbox and four-wheel brakes. It grew to the 3.3-litre Twenty Three in 1926.  The Forty was finally replaced by the Thirty with straight-eight 4.4-litre engine in 1928. A further series of armoured cars was made in 1927, using a six-wheeled version of the Forty chassis.

For 1928 there was George's last design, a 4446 cc straight-8; only 126 were made before the economic depression effectively killed demand.

Olympia 1930
Twelve months after the Wall Street Crash these were the cars shown by Lanchester on their stand at the Olympia Motor Show in October 1930:
 21 hp 6-cylinder landaulette by Maythorn, £1,775, chassis only £1,050
 31 hp 8-cylinder limousine by Hooper, £2,300, chassis only £1,325
 31 hp 8-cylinder 6/7-seater coupé de ville by Windovers £2,435
The engines were 3,330 and 4,440 cc respectively, with a wheelbase and track of:
 6-cylinder:  and 
 8-cylinder:  and

Sale or liquidation
Within weeks, their bank called in the company's overdraft of £38,000 forcing immediate liquidation of the company's assets. Because their current premises were next door to BSA's Armourer Mills at Sparkbrook a sale to BSA made sense. Thomas Hamilton Barnsley (1867–1930), the principal shareholder, chairman and managing director negotiated a sale of all share capital to BSA group shortly before his death on Christmas Day 1930. BSA's purchase of the all of the shares was completed in January 1931 for £26,000, a fraction of the value of the assets. Car production was transferred to Lanchester's new sister subsidiary, Daimler, at Motor Mills, Sandy Lane, Radford, Coventry.

Daimler
George Lanchester was kept on as a senior designer and Frank became the Lanchester  sales director. The first new offering, still designed by George Lanchester, was a version of the Daimler Light Twenty, the Lanchester Eighteen with hydraulic brakes and a Daimler fluid flywheel. The Ten of 1933 was an upmarket version of the BSA Ten. The pre-war Fourteen Roadrider of 1937, was almost identical to the Daimler New Fifteen.

The then Duke of York, a repeat customer during the 1920s and 1930s, preferred this less showy version of a Daimler car and took delivery of a pair of specially built Daimler straight-eight limousines with the Lanchester grille and badges.

Post war, a ten-horsepower car was reintroduced with the 1287 cc LD10 which didn't have a Daimler equivalent and the four-cylinder 1950 Fourteen / Leda. The very last model, of which only prototypes were produced, was called the Sprite.

Jaguar, Ford, Tata
Daimler was in decline, and in 1960 BSA sold Daimler's premises and business to Jaguar Cars who have since used the Daimler name on their most expensive products. Jaguar has moved into and out of the Ford group and since 2008 Jaguar, Lanchester belongs to Tata Motors.

Monument

An open-air sculpture, the Lanchester Car Monument, in the Bloomsbury Heartlands area of Birmingham, designed by Tim Tolkien, on the site where Lanchester built their first four-wheel petrol car in 1895.

Lanchester cars

In Popular Culture 

A fictional Lanchester Factory is featured in the opening scenes of Peaky Blinders (TV series) series 3 episode 2

See also 
 List of car manufacturers of the United Kingdom

References

External links

 Lanchester 28 landau 1910
a Lanchester collection
Lanchester 40 6178cc phaeton 1925
Lanchester Roadrider 1937
Daimler – the first Lanchester car
Daimler – fluid flywheel
 Birmingham's Industrial History Website

1899 establishments in England
1955 disestablishments in England
British companies established in 1899
British Leyland
Daimler Company
Defunct companies based in Birmingham, West Midlands
Defunct motor vehicle manufacturers of England
Former defence companies of the United Kingdom
Jaguar Cars
Jaguar Land Rover
 
Manufacturing companies based in Birmingham, West Midlands
Coventry motor companies
Vehicle manufacturing companies disestablished in 1955
Vehicle manufacturing companies established in 1899
Veteran vehicles
World War I vehicles of the United Kingdom
British companies disestablished in 1955